Claire Coryl Julia Coutinho (born 8 July 1985) is a British politician who has been the Member of Parliament (MP) for East Surrey since the 2019 general election. She has been serving as Parliamentary Under-Secretary of State for Children, Families and Wellbeing since October 2022. She served as Parliamentary Under Secretary of State for Disabled People from September to October 2022. She is a member of the Conservative Party. Before her political career, Coutinho worked for investment bank Merrill Lynch, accounting firm KPMG and as a special adviser in HM Treasury.

Early life
Coutinho was born in 1985 in London. Her parents emigrated from India in the late 1970s and are of Goan Christian descent. Her father Winston was a retired anaesthetist, and her mother Maria is a GP. Coutinho was privately educated at James Allen's Girls' School in Dulwich. She studied mathematics and philosophy at Exeter College, Oxford. After graduating, she worked in the emerging markets equity team as an associate at the investment bank Merrill Lynch for nearly four years. In 2012, Coutinho left the company, and co-founded a literary-themed supper club, The Novel Diner. Two years later, she appeared on the cooking game show The Taste.

Coutinho then worked for two years at Iain Duncan Smith's centre-right think tank Centre for Social Justice. She then became a programme director for the industry group Housing and Finance Institute. After this, she worked for accounting firm KPMG as a Corporate Responsibility Manager. Coutinho left the company to become a special adviser at HM Treasury. Initially she worked for Parliamentary Secretary to the Treasury Julian Smith, and then became an aide to the Chief Secretary to the Treasury Rishi Sunak. Coutinho has commented that she left KPMG to join the government as a special adviser so that she could help deliver Brexit "from the inside", which she had supported in the 2016 EU referendum.

Parliamentary career
Coutinho was selected as the Conservative candidate for East Surrey on 11 November 2019. It is a safe Conservative constituency having elected a member of the party since 1918. She was elected as MP in the 2019 general election with a majority of 24,040 (40.3%). The seat had previously been held by former minister Sam Gyimah who had the Conservative whip withdrawn after voting for the EU Withdrawal Act, an attempt to prevent a no-deal Brexit, and had subsequently joined the Liberal Democrats.

In May 2020, she was criticised by several of her local constituents for supporting Dominic Cummings (then the PM's chief advisor) in taking a controversial 260 mile trip from London to County Durham during a national lockdown in the COVID-19 pandemic. In June 2020, an apparent protest took place as the windows of the East Surrey Conservative Association offices were daubed in black paint. Surrey Police stated they were investigating the vandalism.

Coutinho was appointed as a Parliamentary Private Secretary at HM Treasury, and joined the advisory board of the centre-right think tank Onward in February 2020. She resigned from her position as PPS on 6 July 2022 in protest at Prime Minister Boris Johnson's leadership following the Chris Pincher scandal. Coutinho endorsed Rishi Sunak in the July–September 2022 Conservative Party leadership election.

References

External links

Official website

|-

Living people
Conservative Party (UK) MPs for English constituencies
UK MPs 2019–present
21st-century British women politicians
Alumni of Exeter College, Oxford
KPMG people
Merrill (company) people
British politicians of Indian descent
Female members of the Parliament of the United Kingdom for English constituencies
1985 births
21st-century English women
21st-century English people